Interurban Trail may refer to:

 Interurban Trail (King County), a rail trail in King County, Washington
 Interurban Trail (Sangamon County), a rail trail in Sangamon County, Illinois
 Interurban Trail (Snohomish County), a rail trail in Snohomish County, Washington
 Interurban Trail (Whatcom County), a rail trail in Whatcom County, Washington
 Ozaukee Interurban Trail, a rail trail in Ozaukee County, Wisconsin